Matthieu de La Teulière († 1702) was a 17th-century French artist. From 1684 to 1699 he was the director of the French Academy in Rome.

References

External links 
 Archives of the Academy of France in Rome
 Book about the art politics of Louis XIV.

17th-century French painters
French male painters